Joan Ann Olivier, Baroness Olivier,  (née Plowright; born 28 October 1929), professionally known as Dame Joan Plowright, is an English retired actress whose career spanned over six decades. She has won two Golden Globe Awards and a Tony Award and has been nominated for an Academy Award, an Emmy and two BAFTA Awards. She was the second of only four actresses (as of 2020) to have won two Golden Globes in the same year. She won the Laurence Olivier Award for Actress of the Year in a New Play in 1978 for Filumena.

Early life
Plowright was born on 28 October 1929 in Brigg, Lincolnshire, the daughter of Daisy Margaret (née Burton) and William Ernest Plowright, who was a journalist and newspaper editor. She attended Scunthorpe Grammar School and trained at the Bristol Old Vic Theatre School.

Career
Plowright made her stage debut at Croydon in 1948 and her London debut in 1954. In 1956 she joined the English Stage Company at the Royal Court Theatre and was cast as Margery Pinchwife in The Country Wife. She appeared with George Devine in the Eugène Ionesco play, The Chairs, Shaw's Major Barbara and Saint Joan.

In 1957, Plowright co-starred with Sir Laurence Olivier in the original London production of John Osborne's The Entertainer, taking over the role of Jean Rice from Dorothy Tutin when the play transferred from the Royal Court to the Palace Theatre. She continued to appear on stage and in films such as The Entertainer (1960). In 1961, she received a Tony Award for her role in A Taste of Honey on Broadway.

Through her marriage to Laurence Olivier, she became closely associated with his work at the National Theatre from 1963 onwards. In the 1990s she began to appear more regularly in films, including Enchanted April (1992), for which she won a Golden Globe Award and an Academy Award nomination, Dennis the Menace (1993), a cameo in Last Action Hero (also 1993), 101 Dalmatians (1996), playing Nanny, and Tea With Mussolini (1999). Among her television roles, she won another Golden Globe Award and earned an Emmy Award nomination for the HBO film Stalin in 1992 as the Soviet dictator's mother-in-law. Her pair of 1992 performances (Enchanted April and Stalin) marked only the second time an actress (after Sigourney Weaver, for performances in 1988) won two Golden Globes in the same year; as of the January 2020 presentation, only Helen Mirren (for performances in 2006) and Kate Winslet (for performances in 2008) have duplicated this feat. In 1994, she was awarded the Women in Film Crystal Award.

In 2003, Plowright performed in the stage production Absolutely! (Perhaps) in London. She was appointed honorary president of the English Stage Company in March 2009, succeeding John Mortimer, who died in January 2009. She was previously vice-president of the company.

Plowright was appointed a Commander of the Order of the British Empire (CBE) in the 1970 New Year Honours and was promoted to Dame Commander (DBE) in the 2004 New Year Honours.

Plowright's vision declined steadily during the late 2000s and early 2010s due to macular degeneration. In 2014, she officially announced her retirement from acting because she had become completely blind.

Personal life
Plowright was first married to Roger Gage, an actor, in September 1953. She divorced him and, in 1961, married Laurence Olivier after the ending of his twenty-year marriage to the actress Vivien Leigh. The couple had three children, son Richard (born December 1961), daughter Tamsin Agnes Margaret (born January 1963) and daughter Julie-Kate (born July 1966). Both daughters became actresses. The couple remained married until Olivier's death in 1989.

Her brother, David Plowright (1930–2006), was an executive at Granada Television.

Legacy
The Plowright Theatre in Scunthorpe is named in Plowright's honour.

Styles
Upon her marriage she became Lady Olivier. In 1970, her husband Sir Laurence Olivier was made a life peer and Plowright became Lady Olivier of Brighton in the County of Sussex. As the wife and widow of a life peer, she is entitled to be styled The Right Honourable The  Lady Olivier, and since 2004, “The Lady Olivier DBE”. 

In 2004 she was made a Dame Commander of the Order of the British Empire (DBE), and is professionally known as Dame Joan Plowright.

Filmography

Film

Television

Theatre

Awards and nominations

References

External links

Performances listed in Theatre Archive University of Bristol
 

1929 births
Living people
20th-century English actresses
21st-century English actresses
Actresses awarded damehoods
Actresses from Lincolnshire
Alumni of Bristol Old Vic Theatre School
Best Supporting Actress Golden Globe (film) winners
Best Supporting Actress Golden Globe (television) winners
Olivier
Dames Commander of the Order of the British Empire
English film actresses
English stage actresses
English television actresses
Laurence Olivier Award winners
People from Brigg
Spouses of life peers
Tony Award winners
Wives of knights